Stefan Mikhailovich Reshko (born 24 March 1947) is a former Ukrainian footballer.

External links
Profile

1947 births
Living people
Ukrainian footballers
Soviet footballers
Soviet Union international footballers
FC Chornomorets Odesa players
FC Dynamo Kyiv players
FC Hoverla Uzhhorod players
Soviet Top League players
Olympic footballers of the Soviet Union
Footballers at the 1976 Summer Olympics
Olympic bronze medalists for the Soviet Union
Olympic medalists in football
FC Nyva Vinnytsia players
Medalists at the 1976 Summer Olympics
Association football defenders
Sportspeople from Zakarpattia Oblast